Hurricane Beulah was the second tropical storm, second hurricane, and only major hurricane during the 1967 Atlantic hurricane season. It tracked through the Caribbean, struck the Yucatán Peninsula of Mexico as a major hurricane, and moved west-northwestward into the Gulf of Mexico, briefly gaining Category 5 intensity. It was the strongest hurricane during the 1967 Atlantic hurricane season. The hurricane made landfall just north of the mouth of the Rio Grande River as a Category 3 hurricane. It spawned 115 tornadoes across Texas, which established a new record for the highest amount of tornadoes produced by a tropical cyclone. Due to its slow movement over Texas, Beulah led to significant flooding. Throughout its path, at least 59 people were killed and total damage reached $234.6 million (1967 USD), of which $200 million occurred in the United States, $26.9 million occurred in Mexico, and $7.65 million occurred in the eastern Caribbean.

Meteorological history

On August 22, 1967, an ESSA-5 satellite image depicted an area of enhanced convection—shower and thunderstorm activity—east of the Western High Plateau in Cameroon over central Africa. Reaching the western slopes of the mountains two days later, the tropical wave became more coherent with clouds condensing along its axis. A research paper published in 1969 refers to the disturbance as a depression as it neared the west coast of Africa; however, this significantly differs from the official Atlantic hurricane database, which does not mention the system at that time, as a surface circulation likely did not exist. Regardless, the system emerged over the Atlantic Ocean around 12°N on August 28, as represented by barometric pressure falls in Dakar, Senegal. Once over water, the system interacted with the Intertropical Convergence Zone and continued westward along an undulating path with no further organization. It was not until a United States Navy weather reconnaissance plane flew into the disturbance on September 4, while it was located east of the Lesser Antilles, that signs of development were apparent. Corresponding observations from ships in the region on September 5 confirmed the existence of a 1010 mbar (hPa) low-pressure area.

A slow-moving system, the depression steadily organized as it approached the Lesser Antilles. Observations from aircraft reconnaissance indicated that the system attained gale-force winds by 12:00 UTC on September 7, resulting in its upgrade to a tropical storm. It was also assigned the name Beulah, making it the second named storm of the 1967 season. Shortly after being named, Beulah clipped the southern coast of Martinique and entered the eastern Caribbean. Feeding off the warm waters of the Caribbean, the cyclone quickly strengthened and reached Category 1 hurricane intensity by 18:00 UTC on September 8. At this time, 1-minute sustained winds were estimated to be at least , ranking Beulah as a Category 4 hurricane on the Saffir–Simpson hurricane scale (SSHS).

During the evening of September 9, Beulah turned westward as weak ridge developed over the Bahamas, between it and the newly formed Tropical Storm Doria. The powerful storm weakened somewhat as an eyewall replacement cycle began to take shape. The smaller eye soon dissipated, and the larger one became the single, dominant feature by the morning of September 10. The completion of this process marked the first time that an eyewall replacement cycle was observed in its entirety. The aforementioned westward turn placed the Dominican Republic in the line of danger, an area still reeling from the devastating effects of Hurricane Inez just one year prior. However, the storm unexpectedly collapsed as it approached the Barahona Peninsula and struck the area as a greatly weakened, though still significant, Category 1 hurricane, with estimated winds of  around 18:00 UTC on September 11.

Skirting the southern coast of Haiti's Tiburon Peninsula, Beulah further degraded to a tropical storm by the morning of September 12. Unseasonably strong wind shear associated with the jet stream, resulting from an upper-level trough to the north, and the cyclone's interaction with land were responsible for the dramatic degradation. By the time it had cleared Haiti, Beulah was no more than a minimal tropical storm, with sustained winds near . The storm's central pressure had also risen by roughly 60 mbar (hPa) to 1000 mbar (hPa). Originally seen as a threat to Jamaica, northeasterly flow induced a southerly component to the track and pushed the cyclone south of the island on September 13. The shear previously impeding organization abated on September 14, and a ridge re-established itself to Beulah's north, allowing the storm to resume a west-northwest to northwest track.

Beulah ultimately made landfall on Cozumel Island, with winds of at least  later that day, and struck the mainland Yucatán Peninsula hours later. Despite moving over land, little weakening took place by the time the hurricane emerged over the Gulf of Mexico about 24 hours later. The hurricane maintained its intensity throughout September 18, as it moved west-northwest to southern Tamaulipas, Mexico. However, on September 19, a pronounced phase of rapid intensification, took place as Beulah turned northwest to the Rio Grande Valley region. Aircraft reconnaissance throughout the day found falling pressures and ultimately measured a value of 923 mbar (hPa) around 18:00 UTC. This was the second-lowest pressure ever recorded by aircraft at the time, behind a 920 mbar (hPa) measurement in Hurricane Hattie of 1961.

Regarded as the third-largest hurricane on record at the time, Beulah moved along a slowing, erratic, and somewhat cycloidal path. Slight weakening ensued as it neared land and Beulah ultimately made its final landfall south of Brownsville, Texas, near the mouth of the Rio Grande River around 13:00 UTC on September 20. No direct measurements exist at the core of the hurricane as it moved ashore; however, based on a minimum pressure of 951 mbar (hPa) in Brownsville, the hurricane likely struck land with a central pressure below that value. According to the National Hurricane Center, Beulah struck as a Category 3 hurricane, and was originally thought to have had a central pressure of 950 mbar (hPa) at landfall, but a 2020 re-evaluation as part of the Atlantic hurricane reanalysis project lowered this to 940 mbar. Once over land, the hurricane slowly weakened as it remained relatively close to the coast. Sustained winds dropped below hurricane-force on September 21, roughly 24 hours after landfall. The system subsequently stalled near Alice, Texas, before turning to the southwest. It was initially thought that, after diminishing to a tropical depression late on September 22, Beulah's circulation finally dissipated over the mountainous terrain of Nuevo León, Mexico; however, the 2020 reanalysis concluded that Beulah survived through at least September 24, when it reemerged into the Gulf of Mexico, crossing the Mexican coast between the cities of Tampico and Tuxpan. Due to a lack of suitable observations, it is unknown how much longer after this Beulah continued to exist as a tropical depression over the southern Gulf of Mexico before degenerating into an open trough.

Preparations

Hispaniola
Following Beulah's rapid intensification on September 9, a hurricane watch was issued for the whole of Hispaniola on September 9, with emphasis on a threat to the southern coast. Warnings were soon raised for areas between Barahona and Cabo Engaño in the Dominican Republic.

Across the Dominican Republic, an estimated 200,000 people evacuated from coastal areas.

United States
Beginning on the afternoon of September 17, people were advised to remain off the beaches of Padre, Mustang, and St. Joseph Islands. Immediate evacuation of Port Aransas and Mustang, Padre, and St. Joseph Islands was advised on the morning of September 19. Most residents and others on the islands evacuated, including the personnel of Padre Island National Seashore. About 40 persons remained on the islands, including about 20 at Port Aransas. Immediate evacuation of Rockport and Live Oak and Lamar Peninsulas was advised in the evening of September 19. These areas and the towns of Ingleside and Aransas Pass were nearly completely evacuated. About 50 persons remained in Rockport. The evacuation of the University of Corpus Christi was advised on the morning of September 20, and Corpus Christi Beach and parts of Flour Bluff were also evacuated. During the storm there were 30,000 people in shelters in Nueces and San Patricio Counties, including 6,000 in Corpus Christi.

Impact

Eastern Caribbean

In the days preceding Beulah, a stationary trough over the Lesser Antilles produced several days of heavy rain and set the stage for significant flooding. On September 7 Beulah brought torrential rains to the already saturated region, with reports of more than  received by the Weather Bureau. Hardest hit were the French West Indies, especially Martinique. During an 18‑hour span,  fell on the island. Severe flooding claimed 15 lives on Martinique and destroyed many homes. The banana crop sustained extensive losses. Across the island nearly 1,000 residents were left homeless, including 400 in Fort-de-France. Damage on the island amounted to $4.5 million. Supplies of fresh water were severely limited for two days following the storm.

Heavy rains triggered flooding and landslides across St. Vincent, blocking numerous roads and causing some damage. Two children were killed after a boulder, dislodged by the rains, crashed into their home. Damage on St. Lucia reached $3 million, mainly stemming from the banana crop which was largely ruined. The periphery of the hurricane brought rainfall primarily to southwestern Puerto Rico, where a maximum of  fell at Maricao. One person lost their life on the island and damage was a minimal $150,000.

Owing to effective evacuations, only two people lost their lives in the Dominican Republic. The core of Beulah impacted areas devastated by Hurricane Inez a year prior, and left extensive damage in its wake. Early reports indicated that more than 1,000 people were left homeless across the Barahona Peninsula. Flash flooding affected the southern coasts of both the Dominican Republic and Haiti.

Beulah had limited impact on Jamaica as it brushed the island as a weak tropical storm. According to newspapers, gale-force winds affected the nation though there were no reports of damage.

Mexico

Striking Cozumel Island and the Yucatán Peninsula on September 17 as a Category 2 hurricane, Beulah caused considerable damage and killed 11 people across the region. Wind gusts up to  severed communication lines, downed power lines and felled trees. The Puerto Morelos lighthouse on the Riviera Maya was undermined by the storm; it was never torn down and the leaning tower remains a tourist attraction in the area. Under the force of the powerful winds, several structures collapsed across the Peninsula, resulting in six fatalities. Nearly every buildings on Cozumel Island sustained damage, roughly half of which lost their roofs. Four people were also killed in Playa del Carmen. Along the coast, Beulah's storm surge flooded areas within  of the coastline, washing out roads and leaving "graveyards of boats." Throughout the Yucatán Peninsula, an estimated 5,000 people were left homeless and at least 30,000 were affected by the storm.

Throughout Mexico, Beulah killed 19 people. Economic losses across Tampico reached 500 million pesos.

United States
In Texas upon landfall, an  storm surge inundated lower Padre Island. The force of the storm tide made 31 cuts completely through the barrier island. Padre Island suffered significant devastation, and the island's sensitive ecosystem was altered by the storm. Since the hurricane bent the anemometer 30 degrees from the vertical, it is possible the winds at Brownsville were underestimated. Beulah spawned a record 115 tornadoes which destroyed homes, commercial property, and inflicted serious damage on the region's agricultural industry. The tornado record from Beulah would survive until Hurricane Ivan set a new record in 2004. The Rio Grande Valley's citrus industry, based on cultivation of the famous "Ruby Red" grapefruit, was particularly hard hit.

The lower Rio Grande Valley, the four-county region that comprises deep south Texas, was inundated with torrential rains. Falfurrias received more rain from Beulah than it normally records during one year. Areas south of Laredo, San Antonio, and Matagorda were isolated for more than a week due to the resulting flood. On September 28, President Lyndon Baines Johnson declared twenty-four counties in southern Texas a disaster area.

Animal life in the region responded in various ways to survive. Ants survived the floods by congregating in spheres of living colonies and floated down streams to safety. Predaceous beetle larvae preyed on frogs and rodents. Crustaceans from the beaches migrated en masse to the protection of high ground.

Hurricane Beulah caused an estimated US$200 million in damage. Sources report 15 total deaths from the storm.

Aftermath and retirement

Across the Yucatán Peninsula, the Government of Mexico set up an air lift of food and medical supplies to isolated areas by September 18.

The name Beulah was retired and will never be used for an Atlantic hurricane again; it was replaced with Beth in 1971.

See also

 List of Atlantic hurricanes
 List of retired Atlantic hurricane names
 List of Category 5 Atlantic hurricanes
 List of wettest tropical cyclones in Texas
 Hurricane Harvey (2017), another Hurricane that caused severe flooding in Texas and tied Hurricane Katrina as the costliest tropical cyclone on record
 List of tornadoes spawned by tropical cyclones

References
General

Specific

External links

Hurricane Beulah HPC Rainfall Page

Beulah
Beulah
Beulah
Beulah
Beulah
Beulah
Beulah (1967)
Beulah
1967 in Mexico
History of British Saint Lucia